Poole is a constituency represented in the House of Commons of the UK Parliament since 1997 by Robert Syms, a Conservative.

History 
The first version of the Poole constituency existed from 1455 until 1885.  During this period its exact status was a parliamentary borough, sending two burgesses to Westminster per year, except during its last 17 years when its representation was reduced to one member.

During its abeyance most of Poole was in the East Dorset seat and since its recreation in 1950 its area has been reduced as the harbour town's population has increased.

Boundaries 

1950–1983: The Municipal Borough of Poole.

1983–1997: The Borough of Poole wards of Broadstone, Canford Cliffs, Canford Heath, Creekmoor, Hamworthy, Harbour, Newtown, Oakdale, Parkstone, and Penn Hill.

1997–2010: The Borough of Poole wards of Bourne Valley, Canford Cliffs, Hamworthy, Harbour, Newtown, Oakdale, Parkstone, and Penn Hill.

2010–19: The Borough of Poole wards of Branksome West, Canford Cliffs, Creekmoor, Hamworthy East, Hamworthy West, Newtown, Oakdale, Parkstone, Penn Hill, and Poole Town.

2019–present: The Bournemouth, Christchurch and Poole Council wards of Alderney and Bourne Valley, Broadstone, Canford Cliffs, Canford Heath, Creekmoor, Hamworthy, Newtown and Heatherlands, Oakdale, Parkstone, Penn Hill and Poole Town

Constituency profile 
The borough is an economically very diverse borough. In the centre and north are a significant minority of Output Areas which in 2001 had high rankings in the Index of Multiple Deprivation, contributing in 2012 with the remainder to producing for Poole the highest unemployment of the constituencies in the county. However, Canford Cliffs is epitomised by one sub-neighbourhood, Sandbanks with its multimillion-pound properties, the coastline area has been dubbed as "Britain's Palm Beach" by the national media. Alongside oil extraction, insurance, care, retail and customer service industries choosing the town as their base tourism contributes to overall a higher income than the national average, however the divergence is not statistically significant and the size of homes varies extensively.

Members of Parliament

MPs 1455–1629 

 Borough established 1455, returning two members

MPs 1640–1868

MPs 1868–1885

MPs since 1950

Elections

Elections in the 2010s

Elections in the 2000s

Elections in the 1990s

Elections in the 1980s

Elections in the 1970s

Elections in the 1960s

Elections in the 1950s

Elections in the 1880s

 Caused by Schreiber's death.

Elections in the 1870s

 Caused by the election being declared void on petition, after "corrupt conduct and treating".

Elections in the 1860s

 Seat reduced to one member.

Elections in the 1850s

 

 

 

 

 Caused by Robinson's death.

Elections in the 1840s

Elections in the 1830s

 
 

 

 Caused by John Byng's elevation to the peerage, becoming 1st Earl of Strafford

 
 

 
 
 

 
 

 Caused by Ponsonby's resignation

See also 
 List of parliamentary constituencies in Dorset

Notes

References

Sources 

Robert Beatson, A Chronological Register of Both Houses of Parliament (London: Longman, Hurst, Res & Orme, 1807) 
Cobbett's Parliamentary history of England, from the Norman Conquest in 1066 to the year 1803 (London: Thomas Hansard, 1808) 
F W S Craig, British Parliamentary Election Results 1832–1885 (2nd edition, Aldershot: Parliamentary Research Services, 1989)
 Maija Jansson (ed.), Proceedings in Parliament, 1614 (House of Commons) (Philadelphia: American Philosophical Society, 1988)
 Henry Stooks Smith, The Parliaments of England from 1715 to 1847, Volume 1 (London: Simpkin, Marshall & Co, 1844)  

  

1455 establishments in England
Parliamentary constituencies in Dorset
Politics of Poole
Constituencies of the Parliament of the United Kingdom disestablished in 1885
Constituencies of the Parliament of the United Kingdom established in 1950